HMS Hardy was the flotilla leader for the H-class destroyers, built for the Royal Navy in the mid-1930s. During the Spanish Civil War of 1936–1939 the ship spent considerable time in Spanish waters, enforcing the arms blockade imposed by Britain and France on both sides of the conflict. Hardy was transferred to Freetown, Sierra Leone, in October 1939 to hunt for German commerce raiders in the South Atlantic with Force K. After returning to the United Kingdom in early 1940, the ship became flagship of the 2nd Destroyer Flotilla assigned to the Home Fleet. During the Norwegian campaign of 1940, Hardy participated in the First Battle of Narvik where she sank one German destroyer. As the British ships were withdrawing, they were discovered by two other German destroyers that so badly damaged Hardy that she had to be run aground to stop her from sinking. The ship was lifted by a rising tide and eventually capsized.

Description
Steam for the turbines was provided by three Admiralty 3-drum water-tube boilers. The ship's complement was 175 officers and men.

The ship mounted five 45-calibre 4.7-inch (120 mm) Mark IX guns in single mounts. For anti-aircraft (AA) defence, Hardy had two quadruple Mark I mounts for the 0.5 inch Vickers Mark III machine gun. She was fitted with two above-water quadruple torpedo tube mounts for  torpedoes. One depth charge rail and two throwers were fitted; 20 depth charges were carried originally, but this was increased to 35 shortly after the war began.

Service
Hardy was laid down by Cammell Laird and Company at Birkenhead on 30 May 1935, launched on 7 April 1936 and commissioned on 11 December 1936. Excluding government-furnished equipment like the armament, the ship cost £278,482. The ship was assigned to the 2nd Destroyer Flotilla of the Mediterranean Fleet upon commissioning. Hardy patrolled Spanish waters from 1937 through 1939 during the Spanish Civil War enforcing the policies of the Non-Intervention Committee. After the destroyer  struck a mine off Almeria on 13 May 1937, Hardy stood by in case Hunter needed further assistance. Hardy was berthed in Palma, Majorca, on 23 May 1937 when that port was bombed by the Spanish Republican Air Force, but was not damaged. After the end of the Spanish Civil War in 1939, she began a refit in Devonport Dockyard between 2 June and 29 July. The ship was in Malta when World War II began in September.

In October Hardy (pennant no. They refuelled in Rio de Janeiro, Brazil before proceeding to the estuary of the River Plate in case the damaged German pocket battleship  attempted to escape from Montevideo, Uruguay, where she had taken refuge after losing the Battle of the River Plate. She was given a brief overhaul at Devonport between 25 January and 12 February 1940 and was then transferred to Greenock, Scotland for convoy escort duties. The ship rejoined the 2nd Destroyer Flotilla of the Home Fleet in Scapa Flow on 9 March and became its flagship.

On 6 April Hardy and the rest of the 2nd Destroyer Flotilla escorted the four destroyer minelayers of the 20th Destroyer Flotilla as they sailed to implement Operation Wilfred, an operation to lay mines in the Vestfjord to prevent the shipment of Swedish iron ore from Narvik to Germany. The mines were laid on the early morning of 8 April, before the Germans began their invasion, and the destroyers then joined the battlecruiser  and her escorts.

The Admiralty ordered Captain Warburton-Lee to attack German shipping in Narvik, Norway, on 9 April. The following morning Hardy led four of her half-sisters down Ofotfjord in a surprise dawn attack on Narvik harbour during a blinding snowstorm. A torpedo from Hardy blew off the stern of the German flagship, and killed the German flotilla commander, Commodore Friedrich Bonte. Heidkamp sank the next day. Another torpedo hit a merchant ship in the stern. A second salvo of four torpedoes was fired at two other German destroyers, but missed and badly damaged the ore docks. After regrouping, Captain Warburton-Lee led another attack on the harbour later that morning, but inflicted little additional damage due to poor visibility.

As the British destroyers completed their second attack, they were engaged by three more German destroyers. The British destroyers attempted to withdraw to the west, but were pursued by the German ships. Two additional German destroyers crossed the T of the British ships and quickly knocked out Hardys forward guns. More hits to the ship's bridge and superstructure set her on fire, mortally wounded Captain Warburton-Lee and killed or wounded all of the other officers on the bridge except Paymaster Lieutenant G.H. Stanning, the Captain's Secretary. Although badly wounded, he took command and after several more hits disabled her boilers ordered her run aground at Vidrek. The First Lieutenant, who had not been present on the bridge, assumed command and ordered the ship abandoned. Some of the crew delayed doing so until the last torpedo was fruitlessly fired at a German ship and No. 4 gun fired until it was out of ammunition.

Captain Warburton-Lee was brought ashore but died after an hour from his head wounds. 139 other men managed to get ashore, although 26 were seriously wounded. Captain Warburton-Lee was posthumously awarded the Victoria Cross. Hardy was lifted off the beach at high tide and drifted to the head of Skjomen fjord where she capsized in shallow waters. The wreck was still visible as late as 1963.

Notes

References

External links

 IWM Interview with survivor Cyril Cope
 IWM Interview with survivor Stanley Robinson
 IWM Interview with survivor William Pulford
 IWM Interview with survivor Leslie Smale
 Cardstock paper model ship plan for H87 HMS Hardy

 

G and H-class destroyers of the Royal Navy
Ships built on the River Mersey
1936 ships
World War II destroyers of the United Kingdom
World War II shipwrecks in the Norwegian Sea
Maritime incidents in April 1940